Vanishing Point is a racing video game developed by Clockwork Games and published by Acclaim Entertainment for Dreamcast and PlayStation.

Gameplay
The main mode which is Arcade Mode is where you race against opponents in circuit races, but the goal is to finish the race with the fastest lap time which is the Vanishing Point (hence the title). The game is provided with supposedly accurate car physics, which can be experienced through various game modes, tracks and cars. The majority of content is initially locked and is progressively unlocked as you play through the game, a fact the developers later described as a "mistake" and the result of rushed development. Stunt Mode is unique in that the player must complete short courses that involve a variety of jumps, barrel rolls, chicanes and collectable balloons against a time limit.

Development
Vanishing Point was first announced at the European Computer Trade Show, being self-funded by Clockwork Games until Acclaim licensed the game. The game was developed in 18 months with a team of eight people. Neil Casini, director of Clockwork Games, told Official Dreamcast Magazine that they had adopted the game's title as a reference to their efforts to "create a rendering engine that had no pop-up or 'fogging' as far as the eye could see, i.e. the vanishing point". Casini told the magazine that in developing the gameplay they had sought to "emulate and combine the driving model from Sega Rally with the exaggerated reality of Scud Race".

Reception

The Dreamcast version of Vanishing Point received "favorable" reviews, while the PlayStation version received "average" reviews, according to the review aggregation website Metacritic. Greg Orlando of NextGen called the former console version "an example of fine craftsmanship." PlanetDreamcast gave the same console version a favorable review, over two months before the latter was released Stateside.

References

External links 
 
 http://gamesdbase.com/Media/SYSTEM/Sega_Dreamcast//Manual/formated/Vanishing_Point_-_2000_-_Acclaim_Entertainment.pdf
 

2001 video games
Acclaim Entertainment games
Dreamcast games
PlayStation (console) games
Racing video games
Video games developed in the United Kingdom